The men's individual pursuit competition at the 2023 UEC European Track Championships was held on 10 February 2023.

Results

Qualifying
The first two racers raced for gold, the third and fourth fastest rider raced for the bronze medal.

Finals

References

Men's individual pursuit
European Track Championships – Men's individual pursuit